Ramil Hasan is an Azerbaijani diplomat. He served as the Secretary-General of the Organization of Turkic States between July 2014 to July 2018. He also was the secretary-general of the Parliamentary Assembly of Turkic-speaking States (TURKPA).

Early life 
Hasan was born on September 23, 1978 in the Gafan district of the Armenian Soviet Socialist Republic. Ramil Hasan graduated from Baku State University with a bachelor's degree and a master's degree in the history of international relations. He has a diplomatic rank of Ambassador Extraordinary and Plenipotentiary of the first class.

Career 
Hasan served as a Member of the Board of Qaradağ Municipality during 1999-2002. 

Between 2002 and 2010, Hasan worked as a Head of the Department at the State Committee on Work with Diaspora. He also served as the chairman of youth branch of New Azerbaijan Party from 2005 till 2010.

Between 2008 and 2014, Hasan lectured “Contemporary Azerbaijani Foreign Policy” at the Faculty of International Relations of Baku State University. Hasan was elected as the first Secretary General of TURKPA for a four year term held on 29 September 2009 in Baku.

Hasan was appointed as the Secretary General of the Cooperation Council of Turkic Speaking States on 5 June 2014.

Personal life 
Aside from his native language, Hasan also speaks English, Russian and Turkish. He is married and has 2 children.

Awards and titles 
Ramil Hasan was awarded the gold medal of the Crans Montana Forum.

References 

Living people
1978 births
Secretaries-General of the Organization of Turkic States
Members of the 6th convocation of the National Assembly (Azerbaijan)
New Azerbaijan Party politicians